Youku Tudou Inc. (formerly Youku Inc.), doing business as Youku, is a video hosting service based in Beijing, China. It operates as a subsidiary of Alibaba Group Holding Limited. 

Youku has its headquarters in the Sinosteel Plaza in Haidian District, Beijing.

On 12 March 2012, Youku reached an agreement to merger with Tudou in a stock-for-stock transaction, the new entity being named Youku Tudou Inc. In 2014, it had more than 500 million monthly active users, with 800 million daily video views.

Youku is one of China's top online video and streaming service platforms, along with iQiyi, Sohu, LeTV, Tencent Video, PPTV, 56.com and Funshion. However, Youku's domination in the Chinese market was toppled by its competitor Baidu's iQiyi in 2015.

History 
Youku was founded by Victor Koo (Gu Yongqiang), former President of Chinese Internet portal Sohu. Initial funding for the site came from 1Verge, a fund raised by him. A beta version of the site was launched with limited geographic reach in June 2003, and the website was formally launched in December 2003. In 2007, the company received $25 million in funding from venture capitalists. In December 2009, the company announced that it had raised a total of $110 million in private equity funding. Major investors include Brookside (Bain) Capital, Sutter Hill Ventures, Maverick Capital, and Chengwei Ventures.

The company initially emphasized user-generated content but has since shifted its focus to professionally produced videos licensed from over 1,500 content partners.

As of January 2010, Youku.com was ranked #1 in the Chinese Internet video sector according to Internet metrics provider CR-Nielsen, (keeping in mind that YouTube is banned in China). In 2008, Youku partnered with Myspace in China. Later that year, Youku became the sole online video provider embedded in the China Edition of Mozilla Firefox.

In January 2010, Youku and competitor Tudou announced the creation of a video broadcasting exchange network, under which Youku and Tudou will cross-license professionally produced video content.

Youku recorded gross revenues of 200 million RMB in 2009.

On 8 December 2010, Youku was listed at the New York Stock Exchange for its first time. The stock closed at $33.44 on its first day of trading giving the company a market capitalization of approximately $3.3 billion. For the first 9 months of 2010 Youku reported revenue of $35.1 million and recorded a loss of $25 million during this period. YouKu.com seems to have no relation to the Chinese domain youku.cn.

Victor Koo was once an employee of Bain & Company, one of the most prominent management consulting firms in the world.

In December 2018, the company announced a layoff of the president of the unit Yang Weidong due to his assistance to the police in investigation about the case of seeking economic benefits.

The mobile app of Youku was banned in India (along with other Chinese apps) on 2 September 2020 by the government, the move came amid the 2020 China-India skirmish.

Merger 
On 12 March 2012, Youku and Tudou two of the biggest online video companies in China announced plans to merge, creating one of China's biggest video sites. Prior to the announcement of the merger, Youku was the #11 website in China, and Tudou was #14. The company's name was changed to Youku Tudou Inc. The chairman of the board is Victor Koo, the founder of Youku. The company had a stock listed on the NYSE, YOKU before being acquired by Alibaba Group on 6 November 2015. In December 2016 it reported it had 30 million subscribers.

See also

 56.com
 Tencent Video
 Tudou
 iQiyi

References

Further reading
 Youku Information at Business Week

External links 

  
 Corporate information 

2006 establishments in China
Chinese brands
Companies based in Beijing
Chinese entertainment websites
Haidian District
Internet properties established in 2006
Chinese companies established in 2006
Online companies of China
Alibaba Group
Internet censorship in India